Tucker Cawley is an American television comedy writer and producer, best known for writing episodes for Everybody Loves Raymond.  He has also written for Men of a Certain Age, Parks and Recreation, Up All Night, and the short-lived Kelsey Grammer sitcom Hank. He has won three Emmy Awards, including the 2003 Emmy for Outstanding Writing for a Comedy Series.

Career
He is a 1986 graduate of Gonzaga College High School in Washington, DC and a 1990 graduate of the University of Virginia, where he was a member of Theta Chi social fraternity.  Cawley broke into television as an intern for the Psychic Friends Network and a personal assistant to Roseanne and Tom Arnold.

Everybody Loves Raymond episodes
This is a list of Everybody Loves Raymond episodes written or co-written by Cawley.

Season one
"Frank, the Writer"
"Turkey or Fish"
"The Game"
"Fascinatin' Debra" (with Jeremy Stevens)

Season two
"Ray's on TV"
"Civil War"
"Good Girls"
"The Garage Sale" (with Ellen Sandler, Jeremy Stevens & Lew Schneider)

Season three
"Moving Out"
"Pants on Fire"
"Ray Home Alone" (with Ray Romano & Tom Caltabiano)

Season four
"No Thanks" (with Jeremy Stevens)
"Bully on the Bus"
"Someone's Cranky"
"Robert's Divorce" (with Steve Skrovan & Jennifer Crittenden)

Season five
"The Walk to the Door"
"Silent Partners"
"Stefania Arrives" (with Lew Schneider)
"Ally's Birth"

Season Six
"Older Women" (with Philip Rosenthal)
"Season's Greetings"
"Lucky Suit"
"Talk to Your Daughter" (with Ray Romano)
"The Bigger Person" (with Lew Schneider)

Season Seven
"The Cult" (with Philip Rosenthal)
"The Thought That Counts"
"The Plan"
"Baggage" - Emmy Award Winner for Outstanding Writing in a Comedy Series

Season Eight
"Liars"
"The Bird" (with Jeremy Stevens & Mike Royce)
"Security"
"Golf for It" (with Tom Caltabiano & Mike Royce)

Season Nine
"The Home" (with Jeremy Stevens)
"Sister in Law" (with Mike Royce, Tim Peach & Frank Pines)
"The Power of No" (with Aaron Shure)
"Pat's Secret"
"The Finale" (with Philip Rosenthal, Ray Romano, Lew Schneider, Steve Skrovan, Jeremy Stevens, Mike Royce, Aaron Shure, Tom Caltabiano & Leslie Caveny)

Out of Practice episodes

Season One
"...and I'll Cry If I Want to"

Welcome to the Captain episodes

Season One
"Mr. Big Meeting"

Parks and Recreation episodes

Season One
"The Banquet"

Hank episodes

Season One
"Pilot"

Men of a Certain Age episodes

Season One
"Let the Sunshine In"
"A League of Their Own" (with Itamar Ross)

Up All Night episodes

Season One
"First Christmas"
"First Birthday"
"Letting Go"

Season Two
"Friendships & Partnerships" (with Emily Spivey)

The Mindy Project episodes

Season One
"Pretty Man"

Growing Up Fisher Episodes

Season One
"Drug/Bust"
"Secret Lives of Fishers" (with Laura Chinn)

The Odd Couple episodes

Season One
"The Blind Leading the Blind Date"
"Enlightening Strikes" (with Emily Cutler)

Season Two
"From Here to Maturity"

Season Three
"Food Fight" 
"Conscious Odd Coupling" (with Bob Daily)

Superior Donuts episodes

Season One
"Art for Art's Sake" (with Dan O'Shannon)

A Million Little Things episodes

Season One
"The Rock" (with Jordan Hawley)

Season Two
"Daisy" (with Dante Russo)
"Mothers and Daughters" (with Mimi Won Techentin)

Merry Happy Whatever episodes

Season One
"Welcome Matt"
"Ring In The New Year"

Home Economics episodes

Season One
"Bounce House Rental, $250"

Season Two
"Chorizo with Mojo Verde and Chicharron, $45"
"Men's Water-Resistant Watch, $289"
"FaceFlop App, $1.99"

Season Three
"Novel Signed By Author, $22.19"

Awards and nominations
He is most associated with Everybody Loves Raymond for which he won three Emmys, including the 2003 Emmy for best writing for a comedy.

External links

American television writers
American male television writers
American television producers
Primetime Emmy Award winners
Living people
Gonzaga College High School alumni
University of Virginia alumni
Place of birth missing (living people)
Year of birth missing (living people)